The 1986–87 Idaho Vandals men's basketball team represented the University of Idaho during the 1986–87 NCAA Division I men's basketball season. Members of the Big Sky Conference, the Vandals were led by first-year head coach Tim Floyd and played their home games on campus at the Kibbie Dome in Moscow, Idaho.

At the conference tournament in Flagstaff, Arizona, Idaho met third-seed Montana in the first quarterfinal at noon and won by a point, the program's first postseason win in five years.  semifinal the next night, the Vandals lost to seventh-seed Idaho State, the eventual champion, by nineteen to end the season 

Assistants Kermit Davis and Larry Eustachy were both future head coaches of the program.

Postseason results

|-
!colspan=6 style=| Big Sky tournament

References

External links
Sports Reference – Idaho Vandals: 1986–87 basketball season
Gem of the Mountains: 1987 University of Idaho yearbook – 1986–87 basketball season
Idaho Argonaut – student newspaper – 1987 editions

Idaho Vandals men's basketball seasons
Idaho
Idaho
Idaho